John Arthur Newman  (born December 1936) is an English architectural historian. He is the author of several of the Pevsner Architectural Guides and is the advisory editor to the series.

Career
Newman was born in 1936, and has lived most of his life in Kent. He was educated at Dulwich College and Oxford University where he read Greats (classics). In 1959 he became a classics teacher at Tonbridge School. In 1963 he left his teaching post to study for a diploma in the history of European art at the Courtauld Institute of Art, which he passed with distinction. In 1966 he was appointed a full-time assistant lecturer at the Courtauld, where he taught until his retirement.<ref name=Higgott> [https://www.cambridge.org/core/journals/architectural-history/article/john-newman-an-appreciation/62D22BC0CF6FBBE1693FCE8B293BB2F2 abstract]</ref>

While a student at the Courtauld, Newman acted as driver to Nikolaus Pevsner, while Pevsner was undertaking work on The Buildings of England series, which has subsequently been expanded as the Pevsner Architectural Guides to cover Scotland, Wales and Ireland. Pevsner suggested that Newman should research and write the architectural guides on Kent, which were published in 1969. Bridget Cherry, the general editor of the series, and author of a history of the project, describes Newman as the most significant of Pevsner's collaborators, and Pevsner himself considered Newman's two volumes on Kent to be "the best of the whole series". Since 1983, Newman has acted as the advisory editor to the series. 

From 1975 to 1985 Newman was honorary editor of the journal Architectural History. He has served on the executive committee of the Society of Architectural Historians of Great Britain. In 1986 Newman chaired the Pevsner Memorial Trust, which undertook the restoration of the murals at the Church of St Michael and All Angels in Garton on the Wolds, East Riding of Yorkshire in memory of Sir Nikolaus.

Publications
 The Buildings of England Dorset (1972) (with Nikolaus Pevsner)
 Kent – West and the Weald (2012)
 Kent – North East and East (2013)
 Shropshire (2006)

 The Buildings of Wales Glamorgan (1995)
 Gwent/Monmouthshire'' (2000)

Notes

References
 
 
 

1936 births
Living people
20th-century English historians
21st-century English historians
Academics of the Courtauld Institute of Art
Alumni of the Courtauld Institute of Art
Alumni of the University of Oxford
Architecture critics
British architectural historians
British architecture writers
English architecture writers
Fellows of the Society of Antiquaries of London
People educated at Dulwich College